

Louis August Gottschalk (August 26, 1916 – November 27, 2008) was an American psychiatrist and neuroscientist.

Gottschalk earned his M.D. at Washington University in St. Louis in 1943 and his Ph.D. from  Southern California Psychoanalytic Institute in 1977.

He was the founding chairman of the Department of Psychiatry and Human Behavior at University of California Irvine College of Medicine.

He gained national prominence by announcing in 1987 that Ronald Reagan had been suffering from diminished mental ability as early as 1980. He came to this conclusion by using the Gottschalk-Gleser scales, an internationally used diagnostic tool he helped develop for charting impairments in brain function, to measure speech patterns in Reagan's 1980 and 1984 presidential debates.

Gottschalk coinvented software that uncovered a link between childhood attention deficit disorder and adult addiction to alcohol and drugs. In 2004, at age 87, he published his last book, World War II: Neuropsychiatric Casualties, Out of Sight, Out of Mind.

In 2006, his son filed a suit alleging that Gottschalk had lost millions of dollars in an advance-fee scam.

Gottschalk died at his home on November 27, 2008.

Selected publications

Books

Articles

References

External links
Louis A. Gottschalk collected papers via Vanderbilt University

American neuroscientists
Washington University School of Medicine alumni
University of California, Irvine faculty
1916 births
2008 deaths